Kate Simon (December 5, 1912 – February 4, 1990) was a Polish-born American writer.

Life and career
She was born Kaila Grobsmith in Warsaw, Poland, the daughter of David Grobsmith, a shoe designer, and Lonia Grobsmith née Babicz, a corsetiere. Her Jewish family brought her to the United
States when she was four, where they rejoined her father. Kate was raised in the Bronx, New York, and attended Hunter College where she earned a B.A. Her writing career began as a book reviewer for The New Republic and The Nation magazines. She worked for Book-of-the-Month Club,
Publishers Weekly, and as a free-lance editor for Alfred A. Knopf.

Simon became one of America's best known travel writers; several of her guides became best sellers. Her autobiography was written in three parts. The first, Bronx Primitive: Portraits in a Childhood (1982) was one of the New York Times twelve best books of 1982 and was nominated for a National Book Critics Circle Award. This was followed by Wider World: Portraits in an Adolescence (1986) that told of her teen age period and college experiences. The third volume, Etchings in an Hourglass (1990) is about her adulthood. Her work, Fifth Avenue: A Very Social Story (1978), is a social history of Manhattan. A Renaissance Tapestry: The Gonzaga of Mantua (1988) tells the story of the Renaissance through the history of the Gonzaga family.

She was married twice. Her first common-law husband, Stanley Goldman, died, as did her only child Alexandra and her sister, all of brain tumors. She was divorced from Robert Simon in 1947.

Bibliography
 Etchings in an Hourglass (1990)
 A Renaissance tapestry: the Gonzaga of Mantua (1989)
 Mexico, places and pleasures (1988)
 A wider world: portraits in an adolescence (1986)
 Italy: the places in between (1984)
 Bronx primitive: portraits in a childhood (1982)
 Fifth Avenue: a very social history (1979)
 England's green and pleasant land (1974)
 Rome: places and pleasures (1972)
 Paris places and pleasures: an uncommon guidebook (1971)
 New York places & pleasures: an uncommon guidebook (1971)
 London places & pleasures: an uncommon guidebook (1968)
 Mexico: places & pleasures (1963)

References

1912 births
1990 deaths
People from the Bronx
Polish emigrants to the United States
American travel writers
Hunter College alumni
The New Republic people
American women travel writers
20th-century American women writers
20th-century American non-fiction writers